From 1977 to 2006, Anaicut is a constituency in the legislative assembly of the Indian state of Tamil Nadu. Its State Assembly Constituency number is 44. It includes the towns of Pallikonda and Odugathur and the village Anaicut. It is part of the Vellore Lok Sabha constituency for national elections to the Parliament of India until the Election in 2006. It is one of the 234 State Legislative Assembly Constituencies in Tamil Nadu, in India.

Members of the Legislative Assembly

Election results

2021

2016

2011

2006

2001

1996

1991

1989

1984

1980

1977

References 

 

Assembly constituencies of Tamil Nadu
Vellore district